Norabak is a village in the Vardenis Municipality of the Gegharkunik Province of Armenia. The village was populated by Azerbaijanis before the exodus of Azerbaijanis from Armenia after the outbreak of the Nagorno-Karabakh conflict. In 1988-1989 Armenian refugees from Azerbaijan settled in the village.

Etymology 
The village was also previously known as Azizli. The village was renamed Norabak following Armenia's independence.

References

External links 
 
 

Populated places in Gegharkunik Province